Pleurodema nebulosum is a species of frog in the family Leptodactylidae.
It is endemic to Argentina.
Its natural habitats are temperate shrubland, subtropical or tropical dry shrubland, temperate grassland, subtropical or tropical dry lowland grassland, subtropical or tropical seasonally wet or flooded lowland grassland, subtropical or tropical high-altitude grassland, intermittent freshwater marshes, arable land, pastureland, ponds, irrigated land, and seasonally flooded agricultural land.

References

Pleurodema
Amphibians of Argentina
Endemic fauna of Argentina
Taxonomy articles created by Polbot
Amphibians described in 1861
Taxa named by Hermann Burmeister